The 2013 Brazilian Grand Prix (formally known as the Formula 1 Grande Prêmio Petrobras do Brasil 2013) was a Formula One motor race that was held at the Autódromo José Carlos Pace, in São Paulo, Brazil on 24 November 2013. The race marked the 42nd running of the Brazilian Grand Prix. The race was the nineteenth and final round of the 2013 Formula One World Championship. This was also the last race for the 2.4-litre V8 naturally-aspirated engines that were introduced at the 2006 Bahrain Grand Prix and the last race for naturally aspirated engines in general which had been mandatory since 1989.  For 2014 Formula One introduced 1.6-litre V6 turbocharged power units with hybrid energy recovery systems. 

The race, contested over 71 laps, was won by Sebastian Vettel, his ninth straight Grand Prix victory, driving a Red Bull. His teammate Webber finished in second place on his final race, and Fernando Alonso finished third for Scuderia Ferrari. Vettel established the then gargantuan records of 397 points total and 155 points margin to second-placed Alonso, the latter of which still stands today. Red Bull-Renault won the Constructors' Championship with a record difference of 236 points to second-placed Mercedes.

This was the final race for two previous race winners in the form of Heikki Kovalainen and Mark Webber.

This also marked the last race for Cosworth as an engine supplier.

This was also Vettel's last win until the 2015 Malaysian Grand Prix, Red Bull's last win until the 2014 Canadian Grand Prix, and last 1–2 finish until the 2016 Malaysian Grand Prix.

, this is the last time that Brazil hosted the final race of the season.

Report

Background

Tyres
Like the previous Brazilian Grand Prix, tyre supplier Pirelli provided its orange-banded hard compound tyre as the harder "prime" tyre and the white-banded medium compound tyre as the softer "option" tyre.

The teams also tested the company's new tyres for 2014 in the Friday Free Practice sessions.

Qualifying
All qualifying sessions were held in wet conditions. Intermediate tyres were mainly used for Q1 and Q2. Q3 was delayed 45 minutes because of rain, and all drivers started with full-wet tyres, but they ended the session with the intermediate tyres.

Classification

Qualifying

Notes
 – Sergio Pérez qualified fourteenth, but was given a five-place grid penalty for a gearbox change.

Race

Final Championship standings

Drivers' Championship standings

Constructors' Championship standings

 Note: Only the top five positions are included for both sets of standings.
 Bold indicates World Champions

References

External links

Brazilian
2013 in Brazilian motorsport
Brazilian Grand Prix
Brazilian Grand Prix